Ian Barkley (born 8 August 1961) is a former Australian professional rugby league player. Although primarily a second-row forward, he also played as a lock, centre and winger. Barkley made 84 appearances and scored 25 tries in the NSWRL for the Eastern Suburbs (1981–83) and Manly Warringah (1984–88).

References

1961 births
Living people
Australian rugby league players
Manly Warringah Sea Eagles players
Sydney Roosters players
Rugby league second-rows